The Slovenia men's national tennis team represents Slovenia in Davis Cup tennis competition and are governed by the Slovenian Tennis Association.

Slovenia currently compete in the World Group II.

2022 Davis Cup team 

 Aljaž Bedene
 Bor Artnak
 Maj Premzl
 Blaž Kavčič
 Matic Kriznik (Junior player)

Previous teams

 2016
Against Portugal, 16.-18. September 2016:
 Grega Žemlja
 Tomislav Ternar
 Tom Kočevar Dešman
 Sven Lah

Slovenian team lost 0:5

Against Romania, 04.-06. March 2016:
 Blaž Rola
 Grega Žemlja
 Tomislav Ternar
 Aljaž Radinski

Slovenian team lost 1:4

 2015
Against Lithuania, 30.October-1.November 2015:
 Blaž Rola
 Blaž Kavčić
 Grega Žemlja
 Tom Kočevar Dešman

Slovenian team won 5:0

Against Israel, 17.-19. July 2015:
 Grega Žemlja
 Nik Razboršek
 Aljaž Radinski
 David Goršič

Slovenian team won 3:2

Against Slovakia, 07.-09. March 2015:
 Blaž Kavčić
 Tom Kočevar Dešman
 Mike Urbanija
 Grega Žemlja

Slovenian team lost 0:5

 2014
Against Israel, 04.-06. April 2014:
 Blaž Kavčič
 Blaž Rola
 Grega Žemlja
 Janez Semrajc

Slovenian team lost 1:4

Against Portugal, 31. January- 02. February 2014:

 Blaž Kavčić
 Janez Semrajc
 Mike Urbanija
 Tom Kočevar Dešman

Slovenian team won 3:2

 2013
Against South Africa, 13.-15- September 2013:
 Blaž Kavčić
 Grega Žemlja
 Blaž Rola
 Janez Semrajc

Slovenian team won 4:1

History
Slovenia joined Davis Cup competition 1993, year after being accepted to the ITF (International Tennis Federation).

First win, the Slovenian team made was in 1993 in Zambia against San Marino. In the team were Blaž Trupej and Marko Por. Captain was Aleš Filipčić.

First Game at home for the national team was in 1994 against Greece and took place in Maribor. Slovenia won with 3:2.
The same year, Slovenian team also won against Finland, playing away in Ghana.
In 1995, in Portorož, team lost against Zimbabve and later away against Izrael, which has put Slovenia down to second Euro-African Group.
From 2002 to 2010 Slovenia was playing in the Second Group until winning against Finland, Bulgaria and Lithuania in 2010.
In March 2011, the team won against Finland in the great Tivoli Hall in Ljubljana.
In 2012, Slovenia won against Denmark in Velenje, but then lost against South Africa, this time playing away.
In 2013, Slovenia won against South Africa with 4:1 and later won again, this time against Portugal with 3:2.
In March 2016 Slovenia lost 4:1 against Romania, which lead to fall down to the Second Group again.
2017 is a year of fight to get back to the first Euro-African Group, starting with a 3:2 win in Maribor against Monaco team.

See also
Davis Cup
Slovenia Fed Cup team

References 

http://www.daviscup.com/en/home.aspx

http://www.slo-daviscup.si/

http://www.tenis-slovenija.si/

External links

Davis Cup teams
Davis Cup
Davis Cup